Zemu Gap  Peak or  Zemu  Peak is a peak on a high ridge running east of the south summit of Kangchenjunga in the Himalayas. It is located in Sikkim, India. It is one of the highest unclimbed named peaks of the world. There have been no known attempts to climb this peak.

Because of its extremely low topographic prominence, Zemu Gap Peak does not appear on lists of highest unclimbed mountains nor on lists of highest mountains of the world. The website Peakware.com describes the peak as "...one of the highest unclimbed peaks that is not a sub-peak of another massif".

See also
 List of highest mountains

References

External links 
 Anindya Mukherjee Zemu Gap From the South: The First Documented Ascent
 French description

Mountains of Sikkim